The Republic of Korea national futsal team (recognized as Korea Republic) represents South Korea in international futsal and is governed by the Korea Football Association.

Although was the Runner-up in 1999 AFC Futsal Championship, but unlike the 11-a-side game, South Korean futsal does not achieve much success due to lack of investments. After 2014, KFA had decided to improve futsal in South Korea.

Results and fixtures

2022

Achievements

FIFA Futsal World Cup

AFC Futsal Championship

Asian Indoor and Martial Arts Games

All Match Results

 As of 1 January 2020

http://www.futsalplanet.com/matches/index.asp

http://theroonba.com/

Players

Current squad
The following players were called for the 2022 AFC Futsal Asian Cup qualification, held in May 2022.

Previous squads

AFC Futsal Championship
2018 AFC Futsal Championship squads

See also
 South Korea national teams

Men's
 Footballers
 Football team (Results)
 Football B team (Unofficial match results)
 Under-23 football team (Results)
 Under-20 football team
 Under-17 football team
 Futsal team
 Beach soccer team

Women's
 Footballers
 Football team (Results)
 Under-20 football team
 Under-17 football team
 Futsal team

References

External links
 Official website, KFA.or.kr 

Korea Republic
National team
Futsal